"Automático" (Spanish for "automatic") is a song recorded by Argentine singer-songwriter María Becerra. It was written by Becerra and produced by Nico Cotton. The song was released on 8 September 2022 as the second single from her second studio album, La Nena de Argentina.

Background 
In July 2022, Becerra surprised her fans by broadcasting on Instagram via a live transmission. The singer interacted with her followers and teased a short part of "Automático". Becerra described the song as a "old school reggaeton". The singer confirmed that it would be released in September of the same year.

On 5 September 2022, Becerra announced via social media the release date of the song and shared its cover art. The song was released on 8 September 2022 accompanied by its music video.

Critical reception 
Billboard stated "Becerra pays homage to old-school reggaeton in her new single".

Los 40 Alva Navarro reviewed the song, saying "As [Becerra] stated, this could be one of the best songs she has ever released".

Commercial performance 
In Argentina, the song debuted at number 5 on the Billboard Argentina Hot 100 during the tracking week of 25 September 2022. The following week the song would reach a new peak of number 4. On the week of 22 October 2022, the song reached its peak and the top three for the first time at number 3.

Music video 
The music video for "Automático", directed by Julián Levy, was released simultaneously with the song on 8 September 2022. As of 22 January 2023, the video has accumulated 100 million views on YouTube.

Charts

Certifications

References 

2022 singles
2022 songs
María Becerra songs
Spanish-language songs